The 2022 Emperor's Cup and Empress' Cup All Japan Volleyball Championship was the 16th edition of Emperor's Cup and Empress' Cup All Japan Volleyball Championship. The final round of the tournament was held from 9–18 December 2022.

JTEKT Stings beat Toray Arrows with straight sets in men's final, winning the title for the second times. NEC Red Rockets won over Toray Arrows with in 4 sets. This was the first time NEC Red Rockets won the title. Masahiro Yanagida and Sarina Koga were chosen to be MVP of this tournament.

Competition summary

Events schedule
Prefecture round: April – July 2022
Regional round: September – October 2022
Final round: 9–11 & 17–18 December 2022

Participant qualification
Teams of junior high school students and above which are validly registered in the 2022 Japan Volleyball Association under "Team Membership and Individual Registration Regulations."

Match balls
Men: Mikasa V300W 
Women: Molten V5M5000

Competition format
There are three stages in competition: Prefecture round, Regional round and Final round.

Prefecture round:
A tournament was held to determine one team representing the prefecture that advanced to the regional round for each prefecture.

Regional round:
A tournament was held for each district block to determined the teams participating in the final round.

Final round
Knock-out stage
V1 teams from 2022–2023 V.League directly advanced to the final round.

Venues

Final round

Emperor's Cup

Round of 32
Group A

|}

Group B

|}
a.Veertien Mie withdrew from the competition as the spread of COVID-19 among the team one day before the opening.

Round of 16
|}

Quarterfinals
|}

Semifinals
|}

Final
|}

Empress' Cup

Round of 32
Group A

|}

Group B

|}

Group C

|}

Round of 16
|}

Quarterfinals
|}

Semifinals
|}

Final
|}

See also
2022–23 V.League Division 1 Men's

References

External links
Official website

Men's
2022 in Japanese sport
2022 in Japanese women's sport
Japan